= Americanon (book) =

2021 book by Jess McHugh

- First edition
- Author: Jess McHugh
- Original title: Americanon: An Unexpected U.S. History in Thirteen Bestselling Books
- Language: English
- Published: 2021
- Publisher: Dutton

Americanon: An Unexpected U.S. History in Thirteen Bestselling Books is a nonfiction book by American journalist Jess McHugh, which has been commended by reviewers in peak media. The author selected 13 didactic books originally printed in the US (Webster's dictionary, almanacs, cookbooks, school primers among them) on the basis of their best-selling history and their familiar presence in traditional American homes, aiming to identify in their contents their implicit moral contribution to the cultural ripening of the US, and thus unveil the nation's philosophical bedrock. With the endeavor, McHugh hopes to contribute to the search for clues to successfully confront the intimidating realities facing America today. The book was published by Dutton in June 2021.
